LARS may refer to:

L.A.R.S. (Last American Rock Stars), a rap group
Launch and recovery system (diving)
Least-angle regression, a regression algorithm for high-dimensional data
Lesotho Amateur Radio Society
Leucyl-tRNA synthetase, a human gene
Light Artillery Rocket System
Long Ashton Research Station
Lower anterior resection syndrome

See also
Lars, a given name